A stochastic investment model tries to forecast how returns and prices on different assets or asset classes, (e. g. equities or bonds) vary over time. Stochastic models are not applied for making point estimation rather interval estimation and they use different stochastic processes. Investment models can be classified into single-asset and multi-asset models. They are often used for actuarial work and financial planning to allow optimization in asset allocation or asset-liability-management (ALM).

Single-asset models

Interest rate models
Interest rate models can be used to price fixed income products. They are usually divided into one-factor models and multi-factor assets.

One-factor models

 Black–Derman–Toy model
 Black–Karasinski model
 Cox–Ingersoll–Ross model
 Ho–Lee model
 Hull–White model
 Kalotay–Williams–Fabozzi model
 Merton model
 Rendleman–Bartter model
 Vasicek model

Multi-factor models

 Chen model
 Longstaff–Schwartz model

Term structure models
 LIBOR market model (Brace Gatarek Musiela model)

Stock price models
 Binomial model
 Black–Scholes model (geometric Brownian motion)

Inflation models

Multi-asset models
 ALM.IT (GenRe) model
 Cairns model
 FIM-Group model
 Global CAP:Link model
 Ibbotson and Sinquefield model
 Morgan Stanley model
 Russel–Yasuda Kasai model
 Smith's jump diffusion model
 TSM (B & W Deloitte) model
 Watson Wyatt model
 Whitten & Thomas model
 Wilkie investment model
 Yakoubov, Teeger & Duval model

Further reading

Wilkie, A. D. (1984) "A stochastic investment model for actuarial use", Transactions of the Faculty of Actuaries, 39: 341-403
Østergaard, Søren Duus (1971) "Stochastic Investment Models and Decision Criteria", The Swedish Journal of Economics, 73 (2), 157-183 
Sreedharan, V. P.; Wein, H. H. (1967) "A Stochastic, Multistage, Multiproduct Investment Model", SIAM Journal on Applied Mathematics, 15 (2), 347-358 

Financial models
Monte Carlo methods in finance